Todman (7 October 1954 – 1976) was one of the greatest Australian Thoroughbred racehorses and an important sire.  He was perhaps best known as the winner of the inaugural STC Golden Slipper in 1957, being the first of Star Kingdom's five successive winners of the race. In 2023, he was described as "the best winner of the race".
 He was inducted into the Australian Racing Hall of Fame in 2005.

Background
Todman was bred at Alf Ellison's Baramul Stud in the Widden Valley, New South Wales by Stanley Wootton who had imported his sire, Star Kingdom (IRE) and also Newtown Wonder (GB) to Australia. He was a striking chestnut stallion from Oceana (GB) by Colombo. He was a brother to Noholme II (winner of the AJC Epsom Handicap, Cox Plate etc. and a successful sire in US) and the stakes producing sires Faringdon and Shifnal.

Todman won from six furlongs to nine and a half furlongs and was successful five times in races that are now classed as Group One races. Todman was a notable sprinter, winning his first race by 10 lengths. He then won the Golden Slipper Stakes by eight lengths and the Champagne Stakes by six lengths when he defeated Tulloch. He also won the Canterbury Guineas by eight lengths and ran record times in seven of his 10 wins. Todman raced 12 times for 10 wins, one second, and one unplaced.

Racing record

1956–57 season as a two-year-old

10 /11/2019

11/11/2019 November  
Todman did not race as a 4yo, he broke down in the Hill Stakes and did not resume racing until just over two years later.

talaado

Stud record
Todman commenced stud duty in 1960 and stood at the Widden Stud and Baramul Studs in the Widden Valley. He sired 30 stakeswinners with 63 stakeswins including Golden Slipper winners Eskimo Prince (1964) and Sweet Embrace (1967), Blue Diamond winners Blazing Saddles (1977) and New Gleam (1973) as well as other quality stakes winning racehorses, such as Ricochet, Imposing and Crewman (five stakeswins). His progeny have won more than $2.27 million. Daughters of Todman have produced the winners of more than $2.36 million. These winners saw Todman win at least 13 financial sires' premierships to make him one of the best locally bred sires produced in Australasia.

Todman died on 13 June 1976 at the Widden Stud, where he had spent his last four years. He was buried and commemorated by a headstone placed beside Star Kingdom's headstone at the Baramul Stud. In 1978 at least 51 sons of Todman were standing at stud in Australia and New Zealand.

A life-sized statue of Todman has been erected at Rosehill Gardens (home of the Golden Slipper), surrounded by a series of plaques for each of the winners of the great race.

References

External links
 Australian Racing Hall of Fame horses

1954 racehorse births
1976 racehorse deaths
Racehorses bred in Australia
Racehorses trained in Australia
Australian Racing Hall of Fame horses
Thoroughbred family 1-u